Johnny Thunder is a series of fictional superheroes in DC comics.

Johnny Thunder also refers to:

Johnny Thunder (John Tane), a fictional Western character from DC Comics
Johnny Thunder (singer) (born 1932), American R&B and pop singer
"Johnny Thunder" (song), a 1968 song by the Kinks
Johnny Thunder, a character from Lego Adventurers

See also
Johnny Thunders (1952–1991), American punk singer